Canoe paddle strokes are the means by which a paddle (or paddles) is used to move a canoe through the water. Strokes are generally designated as flatwater or whitewater strokes.  The strokes are also combined or modified. Some commonly known and used strokes are in the table below. Names for strokes can vary between geographical regions and even between paddlers with similar backgrounds.

List of paddle strokes
In these illustrations, the bow (front) of the canoe is on the left side of the illustration and the stern (back) is on the right. The red arrow shows the paddle position at the beginning of the stroke.

Variations
There are some differences in techniques in how the above strokes are utilized. One of these techniques involves locking or nearly locking the elbow, that is on the side of the canoe the paddle is, to minimize muscular usage of that arm to increase endurance. Another benefit of this technique is that along with using less muscle you gain longer strokes which results in an increase of the power to stroke ratio. This is generally used more with the 'stay on one side' method of paddling. The other technique is where they bend the elbow to pull the paddle out of the water before they have finished the stroke. This is generally used more with the 'switch sides often' method of paddling. There is also the Maine Guide stroke which is like The Pitch stroke but the blade is feathered as it leaves the water with a kick.

Stay on one side method
The stay on one side method is where each canoeist takes opposite sides and the stern paddler uses occasional J-strokes to correct direction of travel. The side chosen is can be based on the wind and/or current direction, so the stern paddler's forward strokes are pushing the boat in the opposite direction the wind and/or current is, reducing the number of J-strokes required to keep forward momentum, or sides can be chosen based on the paddlers' stronger side, since this is more comfortable and less tiring. A combination of methods for picking sides can be used, and some canoeists will switch sides after twenty to thirty minutes or longer as a means of lessening muscle fatigue, when changing the direction of the boat, or in response to new weather conditions. Both paddlers must paddle on opposite sides from each other except when trying to turn the boat quickly, or in high winds or strong currents.

Switch sides often method
The switch sides often method, also called sit and switch, hit and switch, hut stroke, Minnesota switch or North American Touring Technique, can be described as the paddling technique where one uses the switching of paddling sides to go straight or maneuver. The spoken command "Hut!" is sometimes used by the stern paddler to alert the person paddling the bow to switch sides, giving rise to the term "Hut stroke". This technique is intended to avoid correction strokes after the forward stroke to make a very high stroke frequency possible thus enabling paddling with high speeds for a long time. Maneuvers are generally performed by switching paddling sides (e.g., for a turn to the left, the solo/stern paddler paddles on the right side of the canoe and vice versa.) For this method, in certain situations, two tandem paddlers may paddle on the same side. This method is one of the fastest on flat water and mostly used by marathon canoeists in the US and Canada.

References 

Canoeing